Giesbergeria is a genus of bacteria from the family of Comamonadaceae. Giesbergeria is named after the Dutch microbiologist G. Giesberger.

References

Further reading 
 

Comamonadaceae
Bacteria genera